Nathalie Nattier (1925–2010) was a French film actress.

Selected filmography
 Gates of the Night (1946)
 Patrie (1946)
 Strange Fate (1946)
 Special Mission (1946)
 The Idiot (1946)
 The Barton Mystery (1949)
 Oriental Port (1950)
 Street Without a King (1950)
 Moumou (1951)
 Monsieur Taxi (1952)
 The Cucuroux Family (1953)
 Joséphine, ange gardien (2002) / 1 Episode
 Love Me If You Dare (2003)

References

Bibliography 
 Goble, Alan. The Complete Index to Literary Sources in Film. Walter de Gruyter, 1999.

External links 
 

1925 births
2010 deaths
French film actresses
Actresses from Paris